SR250 may refer to:

State Route 250
Yamaha SR250